Bojan Zogović (born 16 February 1989) is a Montenegrin football goalkeeper who plays for Albanian Super League side KF Vllaznia Shkodër.

Club career
Born in Berane, Zogović started training football with FK Brskovo at the age of 6. He was a member of Red Star Belgrade U17 team, before he started his senior career with FK Berane in 2006. 2006–07 season he spent with Crvena Stijena and later moved in Radnički Sombor with which he promoted in the Serbian First League. He also performed for Marsonia 1909 and Rijeka in Croatia. In summer 2014, Zogović joined Metalac Gornji Milanovac from FK Timok and signed two-year contract. Two years later, Zogović moved to Novi Pazar. In February 2017, Zogović joined Radnički Niš. In summer same year, Zogović moved to Rad, making a debut for new club in the 4th fixture match of the 2017–18 Serbian SuperLiga campaign against Zemun. Making 13 appearances in both domestic competitions for the club, Zogović left Rad in the mid-season. Shortly after, in January 2018, Zogović signed with the Montenegrin First League side Dečić.

Career statistics

References

External links
 Bojan Zogović stats at utakmica.rs 
 
 

1989 births
Living people
People from Mojkovac
Association football goalkeepers
Montenegrin footballers
FK Berane players
FK Crvena Stijena players
FK Radnički Sombor players
FK Banat Zrenjanin players
NK Marsonia players
HNK Rijeka players
FK Timok players
FK Metalac Gornji Milanovac players
FK Novi Pazar players
FK Radnički Niš players
FK Rad players
OFK Bačka players
Zira FK players
FK Kolubara players
KF Vllaznia Shkodër players
Serbian First League players
Serbian SuperLiga players
Azerbaijan Premier League players
Montenegrin expatriate footballers
Expatriate footballers in Serbia
Montenegrin expatriate sportspeople in Serbia
Expatriate footballers in Croatia
Montenegrin expatriate sportspeople in Croatia
Expatriate footballers in Azerbaijan
Montenegrin expatriate sportspeople in Azerbaijan